The Gran Gasoducto del Sur (also known as Venezuela-Argentina Gas Line) was a proposed  long natural gas pipeline to connect Venezuela, Brazil and Argentina. The overall project cost was expected to be around US$17-23 billion.

History
On 9 December 2005, during an annual meeting of Mercosur in Montevideo, the presidents of Venezuela, Argentina, and Brazil signed an accord for the construction of the pipeline. 

In June 2007 Petrobras president Jose Sergio Gabrielli said that the pipeline would not become operational for 20 to 30 years. In July 2007 Venezuelan President Hugo Chávez said that interest in building the pipeline had cooled.

Route
The exact route of the pipeline was never defined. It was only disclosed that the first  section was to run from Puerto Ordaz, Venezuela, through Rondônia, Amazonas and Amapá states in Brazil to Marabá, Pará state Brazil. In Manaus, Amazonas State, the pipeline was to be connected to the Urucu–Manaus pipeline and the Urucu-Porto Velho pipeline. From Marabá, a  branch line to Fortaleza, Ceará State was foreseen. In Fortaleza the pipeline can be connected to the existing system that extends along the coast to Salvador, Bahia State to be connected with the GASENE pipeline.

From there, the pipeline was to be routed by the  section to the border between Rio Grande do Sul State and Uruguay and then cross Uruguay to Argentina.

Technical features
The Puerto Ordaz-Marabá section was planned to have a  diameter and to have 13 compressor stations of 25,000 hp each. The gas amount received in Fortaleza was planned to be 12.75 billion cubic meter (bcm) of natural gas per annum. The Marabá-São Paulo section was to be  in diameter and to include eight 20,000 hp compression stations. The gas delivered to São Paulo was planned to be 15 bcm per annum. The Brazil-Argentina section with capacity of 18 bcm per annum was to include eight 15,000 hp compressor stations.

Financing
The project was to be financed by Petróleos de Venezuela S.A., Development Bank of Latin America, and Caixa Econômica Federal with possible participation of other public institutions and private investors.

References

Natural gas pipelines in Argentina
Natural gas pipelines in Brazil
Natural gas pipelines in Venezuela
Cancelled energy infrastructure
Argentina–Venezuela relations
Argentina–Brazil relations
Brazil–Venezuela relations